Northern Highway may refer to:

 Northern Highway, Belize, also known as Philip Goldson Highway
 Northern Highway, Victoria, in Australia
 A1 autoroute (France), also known as the 'Northern Motorway'
 Great Northern Highway, Western Australia
 "Northern Highway" (song), by Martin Courtney, from the album Many Moons